Shadow is a 1971 Soviet comedy film directed by Nadezhda Kosheverova.

Plot 
The film tells about the confrontation between a smart and kind scientist with his shadow.

Cast 
 Oleg Dal as Scientist / His Shadow
 Konstantin Adashevsky as Butler
 Vladimir Etush as Piestro, Annuanciata's father, hotel keeper, man eater
 Sergey Filippov as Prime minister
 Zinoviy Gerdt as Finance minister
 Lyudmila Gurchenko as Yulia Juli
 Andrey Mironov as Caesar Borgia, journalist, man eater
 Marina Neyolova as Annuanciata
 Anastasiya Vertinskaya as Princess
 Georgiy Vitsin as Doctor
 Yuriy Volyntsev

References

External links 
 
 

1971 films
1970s Russian-language films
Soviet comedy films
Films based on works by Hans Christian Andersen
1971 comedy films
Films based on fairy tales
Films directed by Nadezhda Kosheverova